Acidobacterium is a bacterial genus from the family of Acidobacteriaceae.

See also 
 List of bacterial orders
 List of bacteria genera

References

Acidobacteriota
Bacteria genera